KFQD (750 AM) is a commercial radio station in Anchorage, Alaska known as "News Talk 750 and 103.7 KFQD."  It broadcasts a news/talk radio format and is owned by Alpha Media LLC.  The studios and offices are on Arctic Slope Avenue in Anchorage.

KFQD is the oldest radio station in Alaska and one of the most powerful.  It is a Class A, 50,000 watt, non-directional station broadcasting on a clear channel frequency.  The transmitter is off Merlene Lane in Point MacKenzie. It is also heard on 250 watt FM translator 103.7 K279BG in Anchorage and its adjacent suburbs.

Programming
KFQD begins each weekday with a three-hour block of local news and information.  That's followed by nationally syndicated conservative talk shows including Armstrong & Getty, Dave Ramsey, Chad Benson, Clyde Lewis and Markley, Van Camp & Robbins.  Weekends include Kim Komando, The Great American Outdoors, Big Alaska, Science Fantastic with Dr. Michio Kaku and Bill Handel on the Law.

KFQD was the radio play-by-play home of the ECHL's Alaska Aces, which was simulcast by GCI on their cable network.  KFQD also simulcasts some of the newscasts of KTUU-TV Channel 2, the Anchorage NBC Television Network affiliate.  KFQD is Alaska's primary entry point for the Emergency Alert System (EAS).

History
On May 24, 1924, KFQD signed on the air, before Alaska was a state.  By the 1930s, it was transmitting at 780 kilocycles and was powered at only 250 watts. KFQD had to share the frequency with other stations, so it was limited in what hours it could broadcast.  It was owned by the Alaska Radio Club with studios at 411 Fourth Avenue.

With the 1941 enactment of the North American Regional Broadcasting Agreement (NARBA), KFQD moved to 790 kHz, a regional frequency, still powered at 250 watts, but able to broadcast around the clock.  By this time, there were four radio stations in the Territory of Alaska.  KFQD was the first, followed by stations in Ketchikan, Fairbanks and Juneau.

In the late 1940s, KFQD got a power boost to 5,000 watts. In the 1960s, it moved to the clear channel frequency 750 kHz, shared with WSB Atlanta but far enough away to avoid causing nighttime interference. At first, KFQD was powered at 10,000 watts. By the 1970s, it had raised its daytime power to 50,000 watts, but still 10,000 watts at night.

Then in the 1990s, as the Federal Communications Commission relaxed protections for the original clear channel stations, KFQD was permitted to broadcast at 50,000 watts around the clock, joining WSB as a Class A station on 750 AM.  

In 1998, KFQD was acquired by Morris Communications.

Alpha Media LLC became KFQD's owner on September 1, 2015.

See also
 "Bomb Iran", a version of which was produced at and aired on KFQD in 1980, and which brought some national attention to the station.

References

External links
FCC History Cards for KFQD

1924 establishments in Alaska
Alpha Media radio stations
News and talk radio stations in the United States
Radio stations established in 1924
FQD